Peter Read (born 12 October 1936) is an Australian boxer. He competed in the men's light middleweight event at the 1956 Summer Olympics.

References

External links
 

1936 births
Living people
Australian male boxers
Olympic boxers of Australia
Boxers at the 1956 Summer Olympics
Boxers from Melbourne
Light-middleweight boxers
People from Carlton North, Victoria